Jonathan Edwards (born July 28, 1946) is an American singer-songwriter and musician best known for his 1971 hit single "Sunshine".

Early years
Jonathan Edwards was born John Evan Edwards on July 28, 1946 in Aitkin, Minnesota. At the age of six, he moved with his family to Virginia where he grew up. At the age of eight, he began singing in church and learning to play piano by ear. While attending Fishburne Military School, he began playing guitar and composing his own songs. As a teenager he began performing in front of audiences.

While studying art at Ohio University, he became a fixture at local clubs, playing with a variety of rock, folk, and blues bands.

Music career
In 1967, he and his band moved to Boston and played clubs throughout New England. With Joe Dolce on lead guitar, they played cover tunes as well as their own country blues originals under various names, including the Headstone Circus, St. James Doorknob, and the Finite Minds, and they made an album for Metromedia Records as Sugar Creek.

In the early 1970s, Edwards left the band and began performing as a solo acoustic artist. He would later recall:

Edwards began opening for acts such as the Allman Brothers Band and B.B. King. He signed with Capricorn Records to record his first album, Jonathan Edwards (1971). 

Like most of the songs on Jonathan Edwards, "Sunshine" was written shortly after Edwards left the band. "I felt really fresh, really liberated," he later recalled. "I just went out in the woods every day with my bottle of wine and guitar, sat by a lake near Boston and wrote down all those tunes, day after day." Regarding the theme of "Sunshine", Edwards commented, "It was just at the time of the Vietnam War and Nixon. It was looking bad out there. That song meant a lot to a lot of people during that time—especially me." "Sunshine" reached No. 4 on the Billboard Hot 100 chart, sold over one million copies, and was awarded a gold disc by the R.I.A.A. in January 1972.

Following the release of his debut album, Edwards moved out of the city to a farm in western Massachusetts, which provided the rural, country inspiration for his second album, Honky-Tonk Stardust Cowboy on the Atlantic Records label. This was an album of mostly self-penned acoustic, country-flavored songs about love and life and was closely followed by Have a Good Time For Me, also on Atlantic.

In 1973 he and his friends got together to record a live album called Lucky Day, named after a song he wrote in the truck on his way up to live in Nova Scotia. This "fresh-air break" lasted only a couple of months when his friend Emmylou Harris invited him to Los Angeles to sing backup on her album Elite Hotel. That led to a deal with Warner Bros. Records and two albums produced by Harris' husband/producer Brian Ahern: Rockin' Chair and Sailboat.

In 1979, Edwards moved back to the United States to New Hampshire, and then two years later back to Northern Virginia area where he had grown up. In 1983, he produced and recorded Blue Ridge with the bluegrass band, The Seldom Scene, for Sugar Hill Records. Then in 1987 he recorded a children's album, Little Hands, which was released on the small independent American Melody label. It was selected by the American Library Association as a Notable Children's Recording.

Turning to acting, Edwards toured as the lead in the Broadway musical Pump Boys and Dinettes. When the show reached Nashville, he met an old friend from the folk circuit, Wendy Waldman. She and Mike Robertson convinced Edwards to come to town and record a country album. "I've been making country-sounding records all my life, but never in Nashville. Yeah, let's do it." Edwards said. So, The Natural Thing was produced, recorded, and released on MCA/Curb Records in 1989. "I was crazy about the songs we selected from those great Nashville writers, and the acoustic-based production that Wendy and I put together was just a joy to make and to listen to. I count that as one of the best albums I've ever been involved with."

In the 1990s, Edwards continued to tour, doing session work, and producing his own music as well as that of other talents, such as Cheryl Wheeler ("Driving Home," "Mrs. Pinocci's Guitar"). He took part in the 1994 "Back to the Future" tour that also included Don McLean, Tom Rush, Jesse Colin Young, Steve Forbert and Al Stewart. In 1994 he released One Day Closer, his first solo album in five years, on his new record label, Rising Records. Man in the Moon, which includes several of Edwards' original songs, followed the end of 1997. In September 1997, Rising Records released a remixed, re-sequenced Among Us, a CD by Simon Townshend, younger brother of the Who's Pete Townshend. Edwards also scored the soundtrack for The Mouse, starring John Savage.

In 2001, Edwards celebrated thirty years of "Sunshine" with a First Annual Farewell Tour with Kenny White on piano. In the 2000s, Edwards narrated and performed in a travel series for Media Artists entitled Cruising America's Waterways, which was purchased by PBS. Media Artists also released a companion album. Edwards participated in a second series, which started running on PBS-TV stations in May 2004.

In 2008, Edwards appeared in the romantic comedy film The Golden Boys, starring Bruce Dern, David Carradine, Charles Durning, Mariel Hemingway, and Rip Torn. Set in Cape Cod in 1905, the film featured Edwards in the role of Reverend Perley. In addition to acting, Edwards scored the film.

He continues to tour. In the fall of 2012, he appeared with Michael Martin Murphey in a series of concerts throughout New England.

Jonathan continues to tour both solo and with band members Tom Snow, Rick Brodsky, Rob Duquette and Joe K. Walsh.

Edwards lives in Portland, Maine.

Discography

Albums

Singles

Videos

Appearances
 Elite Hotel (1976) by Emmylou Harris
 Hometown Girl (1987) by Mary Chapin Carpenter
 Womanly Arts (2004) by Liz Meyer
 Anchorman (2006)

References

External links

 Jonathan Edwards official website
 
 

1946 births
Living people
People from Aitkin, Minnesota
American country singer-songwriters
American folk guitarists
American male guitarists
American male singer-songwriters
Atlantic Records artists
Atco Records artists
Musicians from Portland, Maine
American session musicians
Writers from Portland, Maine
Songwriters from Maine
Singer-songwriters from Minnesota
Guitarists from Maine
Guitarists from Minnesota
20th-century American guitarists
21st-century American guitarists
20th-century American singers
21st-century American singers
20th-century American writers
21st-century American writers
20th-century American male singers
21st-century American male singers